Smith Rocks is a group of rocks lying  northeast of Canopus Islands,  west of Kitney Island,  southwest of Wiltshire Rocks, and  northwest of Paterson Islands, in the east part of Holme Bay, Mac. Robertson Land. Mapped by Norwegian cartographers from air photos taken by the Lars Christensen Expedition, 1936–37, and named Spjotoyholmane. Renamed by Antarctic Names Committee of Australia (ANCA) for Captain V. Smith, RAASC, DUKW driver who took part in ANARE (Australian National Antarctic Research Expeditions) changeover operations at Davis and Mawson stations in 1958-59 and 1959–60.

References

Rock formations of Mac. Robertson Land